Tong Feige (born 23 July 2002) is a Chinese footballer currently playing as a defender for Beijing BSU.

Club career
Tong was part of a nine-month training camp with Argentine side Banfield, from 2018 to 2019.

Career statistics

Club
.

References

2002 births
Living people
Chinese footballers
Chinese expatriate footballers
Association football defenders
China League Two players
China League One players
Club Atlético Banfield footballers
Beijing Sport University F.C. players
Expatriate footballers in Argentina